Yann Genty (born 26 December 1981) is a French handball player for Limoges Handball and the French national team.

He represented France at the 2020 European Men's Handball Championship.

Individual awards
 French Championship Best Goalkeeper: 2015, 2019

References

External links

1981 births
Living people
French male handball players
People from Enghien-les-Bains
Handball players at the 2020 Summer Olympics
Medalists at the 2020 Summer Olympics
Olympic gold medalists for France
Olympic medalists in handball